John Cornelius Moberly (22 April 1848 – 29 January 1928) was an English first-class cricketer, cricket administrator and solicitor.

The fourth son of the cleric George Moberly, he was born at Winchester in April 1848. He was educated at Winchester College, where he played for the college cricket team. From Winchester he matriculated to New College, Oxford. After graduating from Oxford, Moberly practiced as a solicitor at Alresford. A keen cricketer, he made a single appearance in first-class cricket for Hampshire against Derbyshire at Derby in 1877. Batting twice in the match, he was dismissed for 27 runs in Hampshire's first innings by Amos Hind, while in their second innings he was dismissed for 4 runs by William Hickton. Although he did bowl in first-class cricket, Wisden described him as "a steady and painstaking bowler, varying the pitch considerably, and was sometimes very successful". He later served Hampshire County Cricket Club in an administrative capacity, serving for many years as its treasurer and chairman of committee. From 1913 to 1918, he served as its president. Moberly died at Southampton in January 1928. His nephew, Robert Awdry, also played first-class cricket.

References

External links

1848 births
1928 deaths
Cricketers from Winchester
People educated at Winchester College
Alumni of New College, Oxford
English solicitors
English cricketers
Hampshire cricketers
English cricket administrators